Symmetrischema insertum is a moth in the family Gelechiidae. It was described by Povolný in 1988. It is found in Colombia.

The larvae feed on Solanum quitoense.

References

External links
Evaluación de Prácticas de Manejo de la Polilla de las Flores de Lulo Symmetrischema insertum Povolny (Lepidoptera: Gelechiidae)

Symmetrischema
Moths described in 1988